The Church of Jesus Christ of Latter-day Saints in Maine refers to the Church of Jesus Christ of Latter-day Saints (LDS Church) and its members in Maine. Official church membership as a percentage of general population was 0.81% in 2014. According to the 2014 Pew Forum on Religion & Public Life survey, roughly 2% of Mainers self-identify themselves most closely with the LDS Church.

The LDS Church is the 6th largest denomination in Maine.

History

On September 19, 1832, missionaries Orson Hyde and Samuel Smith crossed the Piscataqua River and entered Maine. Shortly after, a branch was established in the Saco-Biddleford area. Other branches followed, and in 1835, members of the newly organized Quorum of the Twelve Apostles met in Farmington to establish the Maine Conference which at the time consisted of 4 branches and 100 members. By 1844, 500 persons were baptized. Most migrated west during this time to join the main body of the church.

Stakes

As of February 2023, the following stakes exist in Maine:

Only included congregations that meet in Maine for each stake

Mission
Most of the state is in the New Hampshire Manchester Mission with the far eastern side being in the Canada Montreal Mission.

Temples
Most of the state is in the Boston Massachusetts Temple District with the far eastern side being in the Halifax Nova Scotia Temple District.

See also
Religion in Maine

References

External links
 The Church of Jesus Christ of Latter-day Saints Official site
 The Church of Jesus Christ of Latter-day Saints North America Northeast Area
 The Church of Jesus Christ of Latter-day Saints Newsroom
 ComeUntoChrist.org Latter-day Saints Visitor site
 Joseph Smith Papers A collection of letters, Journals, and other literature of early members in Maine.